Məlikli (also Melikli) is a village of the Zangilan District in Azerbaijan.

History 
The village was located in the Armenian-occupied territories surrounding Nagorno-Karabakh, coming under the control of ethnic Armenian forces in the autumn of 1993, during the First Nagorno-Karabakh War. The village subsequently became part of the breakaway Republic of Artsakh as part of its Kashatagh Province, referred to as Mush. It was recaptured by Azerbaijan during the 2020 Nagorno-Karabakh war.

References 

Populated places in Zangilan District